Paraphilias are sexual interests in objects, situations,  or individuals that are atypical. The American Psychiatric Association, in its Diagnostic and Statistical Manual, Fifth Edition (DSM), draws a distinction between paraphilias (which it describes as atypical sexual interests) and paraphilic disorders (which additionally require the experience of distress, impairment in functioning, and/or the desire to act on them with a nonconsenting person). Some paraphilias have more than one term to describe them, and some terms overlap with others. Paraphilias without DSM codes listed come under DSM 302.9, "Paraphilia NOS (Not Otherwise Specified)".

In his 2008 book on sexual pathologies, Anil Aggrawal compiled a list of 547 terms describing paraphilic sexual interests. He cautioned, however, that "not all these paraphilias have necessarily been seen in clinical setups. This may not be because they do not exist, but because they are so innocuous they are never brought to the notice of clinicians or dismissed by them. Like allergies, sexual arousal may occur from anything under the sun, including the sun."

Most of the following names for paraphilias, constructed in the nineteenth and especially twentieth centuries from Greek and Latin roots (see List of medical roots, suffixes and prefixes), are used in medical contexts only.

Paraphilias

A

B

C

D

E

F

G

H

I

K

L

M

N

O

P

S

T

U

V

W

Z

See also 

 Courtship disorders
 Erotic target location errors
 List of phobias
 Lovemaps
 Perversion
 Sexual fetishism

References 

Sexuality and society
Paraphilias